Fairfax Connector is a public bus service provided by Fairfax County, Virginia, United States, and is managed by the county government. The bus system provides service within Fairfax County, and connects to Metrobus, Metrorail stations, Virginia Railway Express, and other local bus systems. Fairfax Connector serves all of Fairfax Metrorail Stations, the city of Alexandria, the city of Fairfax (weekday middays only), the Washington Dulles International Airport, and the Pentagon Metrorail station (weekdays only, mostly during morning and evening peak periods).

Fairfax Connector, or simply "The Connector", is operated under contract by Transdev, and is the third largest bus fleet in the D.C. area. The Connector provides a fixed-route bus service within Fairfax County on 93 routes and carries about nine million passengers annually. The Connector's goals is to supplement the regional rail and bus service provided by the Washington Metropolitan Area Transit Authority (WMATA), providing reliable local bus service, and to improves the safety of the community of Fairfax County.

History

1980s 
The first buses rolled out in September 1985 as a lower-cost alternative to the Metrobus service of the regional Washington Metropolitan Area Transit Authority.  The original routes connected the southern part of the county (near the Mount Vernon Estate) to the Huntington Metro station which borders Alexandria.  This area continues to be the core of the system, and is noted for the number of residents in the Richmond Highway area who use the service at all times of the day. It had 10 routes, and many routes serves through Huntington Station. These first 10 routes were previously served by Metrobus. In 1988, The Connector began to operate express routes, to connect to Pentagon station. It also expanded through the southeastern portion of Fairfax.

1990s 
In 1990, The Connector took over the operation of the RIBS (Reston Internal Bus Service). Service continues to provide through the southern portion of Alexandria, when Van Dorn Street station opened in 1991. In 1994, the service was extended to the high-technology industrial areas of suburban Reston and Herndon, located between Washington, D.C. and Washington Dulles International Airport.  Along State Route 267 (the Dulles Toll Road), express buses carry commuters from free park-and-ride lots to the Washington Metro system. In 1999, the Herndon-Monroe Park & Ride and the
Tysons Westpark Transit Station opened, extending its operation within the county.

2000s 
After having many buses running on pure diesel, The Connector ordered buses that runs in Ultra-Low Sulfur Diesel
fuel in 2002. These bus upgrades can retrofit the fleet with Green Diesel technology, so the county can go environmentally friendly. More bus stations continues to increase, with the opening of the Lorton Park-and-Ride in 2003, and the Gambrill Road Park-and-Ride in 2005. The Connector began installing the SmarTrip Fare Card technology, so that passengers can pay their fare using WMATA's SmarTrip. In June 2009, service was transitioned from the Metrobus 2W, 12-, and 20-series routes to the Connector in the Centreville, Chantilly, and Oakton areas along I-66 and near Vienna/Fairfax-GMU Station.

On July 1, 2009 MV Transportation took over from Veolia Transport as the operator.

2010s 
Major changes began in 2010, when the Reston East Park-and-Ride closed to make way for the Silver Line construction. After the Silver Line opened in 2014, The Connector modified its service, by providing three circulator routes within Tysons Corner, as well as new service to McLean. Many routes were modified, so The Connector can give access to its riders to transfer within the Silver Line and other portions within the County. On July 1, 2019 Transdev commenced a five year contract to operate the network with an option to extend for a further 10 years.  As previously mentioned, Transdev (then as Veolia Transport) had previously operated The Connector until July 1, 2009.

On December 5, 2019, Fairfax Connector worker went on a strike against Transdev affecting 30,000 riders with all routes operating on Sunday service. The strike joins 130 employees at Metrobus's Cinder Bed garage who went on strike against Transdev on October 24, 2019.

Fares 
The base fares for the Connector are $2.00 on local routes; $4.25 on express routes 393, 394, 395, 396, 599, 697, 698, 699 and 835; $0.50 on routes 350, 423, and 424; and $5.00 on Route 480 (fare is round-trip). Fares are paid in cash (exact change), or WMATA issued SmarTrip card.

Routes 
, the Fairfax Connector bus system consists of 94 routes. The following are the route numbers and names that make up the Fairfax Connector bus system.

Former routes 

These routes have been served by Fairfax Connector at one point but have since been discontinued due to either low ridership, duplication of another route, simplification to other routes, or combined into another route. However some routes would be reincarnated into new routes for Fairfax Connector.

Fleet 
Fairfax Connector operates a fleet consisting of diesel and hybrid buses produced by Orion Bus Industries and New Flyer. , the Fairfax Connector fleet roster consists of the following buses:

On Order

Retired Fleet

Divisions 
The bus fleet, owned and operated by Fairfax Connector, is distributed among three garages in Newington, and Reston.

References

External links 

 Fairfax Connector website

Bus transportation in Virginia
Transdev
Transportation in Fairfax County, Virginia
Veolia
1985 establishments in Virginia